Les Duff (born December 12, 1934) is a Canadian former professional ice hockey player. Between 1955 and 1970 he played 927 games in the American Hockey League (AHL).

Duff won the Calder Cup five times during his playing career to share the record for most Calder Cups won with Bob Solinger, Fred Glover, and Mike Busniuk.

Personal information
Following his playing career, Duff worked 23 years with the Toronto Transit Commission before retiring. His brother is Hockey Hall of Famer Dick Duff.

References

External links

1934 births
Living people
Hershey Bears players
Pittsburgh Hornets players
Rochester Americans players
Toronto St. Michael's Majors players
Tulsa Oilers (1964–1984) players
Vancouver Canucks (WHL) players
Winnipeg Warriors (minor pro) players
Canadian ice hockey left wingers